This is a list of ambassadors of the United States to Lesotho.

Prior to 1965, the area of southern Africa that is now Lesotho was a Crown colony by the name of Basutoland. Along with most of the empire's other colonies and protectorates, Basutoland gained full independence from Britain in the 1960s. The nation was granted full autonomy on April 30, 1965. On October 4, 1966, Basutoland was granted independence, governed by a constitutional monarchy with a bicameral parliament. At the same time the name of the country was changed to The Kingdom of Lesotho.

The United States immediately recognized Lesotho after the nation gained its independence. An embassy in Maseru was established on October 4, 1966, Lesotho's independence day. Richard St. F. Post was appointed as chargé d'affaires ad interim pending the arrival of an ambassador. The first ambassador, Charles J. Nelson was appointed on June 9, 1971. Until 1979 one ambassador was accredited to Lesotho, Swaziland, and Botswana. The ambassador was resident in Gaborone, Botswana.

Ambassadors

Note: Pending appointment of the first ambassador, the following officers served as chargé d'affaires ad interim: Richard St. F. Post (October 1966–July 1968), Norman E. Barth (July 1968–August 1969), and Stephen G. Gebelt (October 1969–December 1970).

Notes

See also
Lesotho–United States relations
Foreign relations of Lesotho
Ambassadors of the United States

References
United States Department of State: Background notes on Lesotho

External links

 

Lesotho
 
United States